Zoster is a pop-reggae group from Bosnia and Herzegovina formed in Mostar in 2000.

They released four studio albums, and new studio album named "Najgori", which will have 10 songs, is expected to be released in 2023. Slogan of the band and concert greeting is "Band Zoster, Your Band".

History 

The group was formed in the fall of 2000 on the initiative of Mario Knezović and Dražan Planinić. The name Zoster appeared after Mario got over herpes zoster, a virus that lives in the human body, and when the immunity drops, it manifests itself on the surface of the skin in the form of a rash and spreads over time, and the Zoster group was created as a result of the drop in society's immunity.

Zoster believes that reggae music is suitable for these dangerous areas where the dose of aggressiveness even in music is too much. The group therefore conveys messages of tolerance, peace, progressiveness and affirmation, and sometimes education.

Festivals 

Zoster performed on several major regional festivals like Exit festival in Novi Sad, InMusic Festival in Zagreb, Sarajevo film festival, Lake fest Nikšić, Jazz fest Sarajevo, Soča Reggae Riversplash music festival, Seasplash Pula, OK Fest Tjentište, Arsenal fest Kragujevac, Bedem fest Nikšić, Love fest Vrnjačka Banja, Mostar Summer Fest and other.

Discography 

Studio albums:

 Ojužilo (Gramofon, 2005)
 Festival budala (Gramofon, 2007)
 Imači kada (Gramofon, 2012)
 Srce uzavrelo (Gramofon and Menart 2014)

Singles:

 Kuda idu svi ti ljudi (Croatia Records, 2020)
 Treba mi keš (Croatia Records, 2021)
 Čovjek želi da je ptica (2022)
 Čovjek zvani činjenica (2023)

References

External links 

 
 
 

Bosnia and Herzegovina musical groups
Musical groups established in 2000
Musicians from Mostar